The Institute of Politics (IOP) is an extracurricular nonpartisan political institute associated with the College of the University of Chicago and the Harris School of Public Policy designed to inspire students to pursue careers in politics and public service. Following the University of Chicago's longstanding tradition of wide-ranging political debate and freedom of expression, the IOP seeks to convene a diverse array of speakers, students, and leaders from a variety of backgrounds for the edification of its student body.

History and structure 

Spearheaded by UChicago alumnus David Axelrod after the Barack Obama 2012 presidential campaign, the IOP's programming unofficially began by sponsoring internships with Politico at the Republican National Convention and Democratic National Convention. The IOP officially opened in 2013 and is consists of four core programs: Civic Engagement, Speaker Series, Internships and Careers, and Pritzker Fellows.

Civic engagement 
The IOP's civic engagement program focuses on activating student interest in public service through student-led initiatives. The largest of these is UChiVotes, a nonpartisan voter engagement initiative founded to boost voter turnout and engagement on the UChicago campus. In 2018, UChiVotes helped register more than 70% of undergraduates to vote. Other student-led programs include the Bridge Writing Workshop
a partnership with Cook County Jail, where students lead creative writing workshops for incarcerated individuals, W+, Leaders of Color, Spectrum, and Tech Team. The IOP also manages The Gate, an independent student-run magazine focused on politics and policy, and "Bridging the Divide," a public service leadership program.

Speaker series 
Another core function of the IOP is a speaker series, in which the institute hosts a plethora of events that connect students with key political figures through live interviews and town halls. Typically, speakers are elected officials, activists, authors, journalists, and other key figures in politics and public service.

Since its inception, the IOP has hosted prominent speakers, including Barack Obama, Joe Biden, Mitt Romney, Rand Paul, Al Gore, Mike Pence, Rick Santorum, John McCain, Newt Gingrich, Bernie Sanders, Elizabeth Warren, Pete Buttigieg, Andrew Yang, Amy Klobuchar, John Brennan, Frank Bruni, Edward Snowden (via videochat), Jon Stewart, Arthur Brooks, Bill Browder, Gina Raimondo, and Chance the Rapper; hosted fellows such as Beth Myers, Michael Steele, Roger Simon, Husain Haqqani, Matthew Dowd, Howard Wolfson, Mark Udall, Tom Harkin, Michael Morell, Jeff Roe, Reihan Salam, and Bakari Sellers.

Internships and careers 
The institute works with UChicago's Office of Career Advancement to provide internships, fellowships, and career opportunities to students. It has arranged over 250 student internships at institutions like the U.S. Capitol, the Brookings Institution, and the White House and placed over 300 students in civic engagement projects.

Pritzker fellows 
Each quarter, the IOP invites a cohort of political figures for an academic term to serve on campus and investigate political issues with the institute. These Pritzker Fellows offer weekly seminars, office hours, and mentorship to current students to share lessons from their careers. For the Fall 2022 academic term, the cohort of Pritzker Fellows included former US Senator Doug Jones, former US Representative Luis Gutiérrez, journalist and author Stephen F. Hayes,  former Senate secretary for the majority Laura Dove, and Indian journalist Rana Ayyub.

Board of Advisors 
The following individuals make up the Board of Advisors of the Institute of Politics:
 Joaquin Castro 
 Stephanie Cutter
 Bob Dold
 Robert Gibbs
 Ed Gillespie
 Larry Grisolano
 Doris Kearns Goodwin
 Heidi Heitkamp
 Bill Kristol
 Ray LaHood
 Isaac Lee
 Michael Morell
 David Muir
 Shailagh Murray
 Mike Murphy
 Beth Myers
 Bakari Sellers
 Darren Reisberg
 Deval Patrick
 Bret Stephens
 Karen Tumulty
 Amy Walter
 Howard Wolfson

See also 
 University of Chicago people

References

University of Chicago
Educational institutions established in 2013
2013 establishments in Illinois
Political science education